Espen Johnsen (born 17 October 1976 in Lillehammer) is a Norwegian politician for the Labour Party.

He was elected to the Norwegian Parliament from Oppland in 2005. He had previously served as a deputy representative during the term 2001–2005.

On the local level he was a member of Oppland county council from 1999 to 2005. Since 2002 he is the leader of the county party chapter, as well as a member of the Labour Party national board.

He grew up in Vestre Slidre, and graduated from Lillehammer University College.

In 2011 he was elected to mayor of Lillehammer

References

1976 births
Living people
Members of the Storting
Oppland politicians
Labour Party (Norway) politicians
Lillehammer University College alumni
21st-century Norwegian politicians
People from Vestre Slidre